Deanna Berry (born 7 May 1998) is an Australian rules footballer playing for the Western Bulldogs in the AFL Women's (AFLW). She was drafted by Melbourne with their second selection and ninth overall in the 2016 AFL Women's draft. She played every match during the season and after the final round match against —in which she recorded eleven disposals, three marks and two goals—she was nominated for the AFLW Rising Star.

After one season with Melbourne, Berry was traded to the  during the 2017 trade period. It was revealed that Berry had signed a contract extension with the club on 16 June 2021, after playing 5 games for the club that season.

Statistics
''Statistics are correct to the end of the 2021 season'.

|- style=background:#EAEAEA
| scope=row | 2017 ||  || 7
| 7 || 5 || 5 || 43 || 6 || 49 || 11 || 7 || 0.7 || 0.7 || 6.1 || 0.9 || 7.0 || 1.6 || 1.0 || 0
|-
| scope=row bgcolor=F0E68C | 2018# ||  || 7
| 6 || 2 || 1 || 21 || 6 || 27 || 6 || 8 || 0.3 || 0.2 || 3.5 || 1.0 || 4.5 || 1.0 || 1.3 || 0
|- style=background:#EAEAEA
| scope=row | 2019 ||  || 7
| 5 || 1 || 2 || 22 || 5 || 27 || 7 || 9 || 0.2 || 0.4 || 4.4 || 1.0 || 5.4 || 1.4 || 1.8 || 0
|-
| scope=row | 2020 ||  || 7
| 5 || 2 || 0 || 14 || 6 || 20 || 3 || 8 || 0.4 || 0.0 || 2.8 || 1.2 || 4.0 || 0.6 || 1.6 || 0
|- style=background:#EAEAEA
| scope=row | 2021 ||  || 7
| 5 || 0 || 1 || 27 || 17 || 44 || 9 || 19 || 0.0 || 0.2 || 5.4 || 3.4 || 8.8 || 1.8 || 3.8 || 0
|- class=sortbottom
! colspan=3 | Career
! 28 !! 10 !! 9 !! 127 !! 40 !! 167 !! 36 !! 51 !! 0.4 !! 0.3 !! 4.5 !! 1.4 !! 6.0 !! 1.3 !! 1.8 !! 0
|}

References

External links 

1998 births
Living people
Melbourne Football Club (AFLW) players
Western Bulldogs (AFLW) players
Australian rules footballers from Victoria (Australia)
Melbourne University Football Club (VFLW) players